The National Union of Docks, Wharves and Shipping Staffs (NUDWSS) was a trade union representing administrative staff working in shipping and related industries in the United Kingdom.

The union was founded in 1909 as the Port of London Staff Association, as a replacement for the recently dissolved London and India Docks Staff Association.  Until 1917, it worked closely with the Port of London Authority, and appointed one of the authority's members as its honorary president.

In 1917, the organisation decided to register as an independent trade union for the first time, and renamed itself as the Port of London Docks and Wharves Staff Association.  Charles Ammon became its secretary in 1918, and Arthur Creech Jones was appointed as its organiser.  They launched it on a national basis, renaming it as the "National Union of Docks, Wharves and Shipping Staff", and publishing the Quayside and Office journal.  Membership grew to 4,381 by 1922, when it became a founding constituent of the Transport and General Workers' Union.

General Secretaries
1918: Charles Ammon
1919: Alfred Short

References

Defunct trade unions of the United Kingdom
1909 establishments in the United Kingdom
Port workers' trade unions
Transport and General Workers' Union amalgamations
Trade unions established in 1909
Trade unions disestablished in 1922
Trade unions based in London